NSLR may refer to:

 National Security Law Report, periodical of the American Bar Association's Standing Committee on Law and National Security
 Nova Scotia Reports, decisions of the Nova Scotia Court of Appeal